Nancy Yareli Contreras Reyes (born January 20, 1978, in Ciudad de México, Distrito Federal) is a female track cyclist from Mexico, who represented her native country twice at the Summer Olympics: 1996 and 2004. She won a bronze medal in the 1995 Pan American Games in Mar del Plata, Argentina.

Contreras won the 500m time trial gold during the 1998 Central American and Caribbean Games, but failed the doping control with Pseudoephedrine and her medal was removed.

Major results

1995
UCI Juniors Track World Championships
2nd Individual pursuit
1999
Track Cycling World Cup Classics
2nd 500m time trial, Round 1, Mexico City
3rd 500m time trial, Round 3, Valencia
3rd 500m time trial, final individual ranking
Pan American Games
2nd 500m time trial
2000
Track Cycling World Cup Classics
1st, 500m time trial, Round 3, Mexico City
2001
UCI Track Cycling World Championships
1st 500m time trial
Track Cycling World Cup Classics
1st Sprint, Round 4, Mexico City
1st 500m time trial, Round 4, Mexico City
2nd 500m time trial, Round 1, Cali
2002
UCI Track Cycling World Championships
2nd 500m time trial
Track Cycling World Cup Classics
2nd 500m time trial, Round 1, Monterrey
3rd 500m time trial, Round 2, Sydney
2003
UCI Track Cycling World Championships
2nd 500m time trial
3rd Sprint
Track Cycling World Cup Classics
2nd 500m time trial, Round 2, Aguascalientes
3rd Sprint, Round 2, Aguascalientes
1st 500m time trial, Round 3, Cape Town
1st 500m time trial, Round 4, Sydney
1st Sprint, Round 4, Sydney
1st 500m time trial, final individual ranking
Pan American Games
1st 500m time trial
2005
Pan American Championships
2nd 500m time trial
2007
Pan American Road and Track Championships
3rd Keirin
2011
Pan American Road and Track Championships
3rd Team Sprint (with Luz Daniela Gaxiola Gonzalez)
2012
Mexican National Track Championships
1st Scratch race
2nd 500m time trial
2nd Keirin
3rd Team pursuit (with Belem Guerrero and Carolina Rodríguez)

References
sports-reference

1978 births
Living people
Mexican female cyclists
Mexican track cyclists
Doping cases in cycling
Olympic cyclists of Mexico
Cyclists at the 1996 Summer Olympics
Cyclists at the 2004 Summer Olympics
Pan American Games medalists in cycling
Pan American Games gold medalists for Mexico
Pan American Games silver medalists for Mexico
Pan American Games bronze medalists for Mexico
Cyclists at the 1995 Pan American Games
Cyclists at the 1999 Pan American Games
Cyclists at the 2011 Pan American Games
Medalists at the 1995 Pan American Games
Medalists at the 2011 Pan American Games
Central American and Caribbean Games medalists in cycling
Central American and Caribbean Games gold medalists for Mexico
Central American and Caribbean Games silver medalists for Mexico
Central American and Caribbean Games bronze medalists for Mexico
Competitors at the 2002 Central American and Caribbean Games
Competitors at the 2006 Central American and Caribbean Games
Competitors at the 2010 Central American and Caribbean Games
20th-century Mexican women
21st-century Mexican women